The CVS Health Charity Classic is a professional golf tournament. It is contested annually as a one-day, three-person team event. Each team is made up of one player from each of three Tours: PGA Tour, PGA Tour Champions, and LPGA Tour. The top two scores at each hole for the team count towards the team's final score.

It is held at Rhode Island Country Club in Barrington, Rhode Island. It is an unofficial event on the PGA Tour and was first played in 1999. The original format was a two-man team event, involving players solely from the PGA Tour. However, since 2017, it has become a three-person team event, with players from PGA Tour Champions and LPGA Tour joining up with a PGA Tour player to form each team. Rhode Island natives Brad Faxon and Billy Andrade serve as hosts.

Television
The event was televised by Golf Channel from 1999 to 2010.  It was traditionally tape-delayed until 4 p.m. on both days to make buying tickets to the event more appealing. In 2009, the broadcast was delayed until 8 p.m. because the final round of the U.S. Open ran into Monday, and the Golf Channel ran post-tournament coverage during the afternoon. The Classic lost many of the PGA Tour members in its field that year because of the run over.

In 2011, coverage moved to Fox Sports Net.  The broadcast was still delayed until 4:00 p.m. as in past years.  It was the first PGA Tour sanctioned event ever covered by a Fox network.  However, Fox declined to renew its contract, as it did not cover any other golf events, and as such, the event has since been untelevised.  It is unknown whether Fox might return to covering the event with the pickup of a small golf schedule, which includes the Franklin Templeton Shootout, an event very similar to the CVS Caremark Charity Classic.

Charity event winners
CVS Health Charity Classic
2019 Keegan Bradley, Brooke Henderson and Billy Andrade
2018 Keegan Bradley, Brooke Henderson and Billy Andrade
2017 Keegan Bradley, Brooke Henderson and Billy Andrade
2016 Keegan Bradley and Jon Curran
2015 Keegan Bradley and Jon Curran
CVS Caremark Charity Classic
2014 Steve Stricker and Bo Van Pelt
2013 Steve Stricker and Bo Van Pelt
2012 Jay Haas and Morgan Pressel
2011 Matt Kuchar and Zach Johnson
2010 Ricky Barnes and J. B. Holmes
2009 Nick Price and David Toms
2008 Bubba Watson and Camilo Villegas
2007 Stewart Cink and J. J. Henry
CVS/pharmacy Charity Classic
2006 Tim Clark and Nick Price
CVS Charity Classic
2005 Chris DiMarco and Fred Funk
2004 Bill Haas and Jay Haas
2003 Rocco Mediate and Jeff Sluman
2002 Chris DiMarco and Dudley Hart
2001 Mark Calcavecchia and Nick Price
2000 Justin Leonard and Davis Love III
1999 Stuart Appleby and Jeff Sluman

See also
CVS Charity Classic - a former PGA Tour event of the same name

External links

Coverage on the PGA Tour's official site

Team golf tournaments
PGA Tour unofficial money events
Golf in Rhode Island
Recurring sporting events established in 1999
1999 establishments in Rhode Island
Health Charity Classic